HOTAIRM1 (HOX antisense intergenic RNA myeloid 1) is a long non-coding RNA gene. In humans, it is located between the HOXA1 and HOXA2 genes. HOTAIRM1 is expressed in cells of a myeloid lineage, and may play a role in myeloid transcriptional regulation.

See also
 Long noncoding RNA

References

Non-coding RNA